Splendrillia whangaimoana is an extinct species of sea snail, a marine gastropod mollusk in the family Drilliidae.

Description
The length of the shell attains 14.3 mm, its diameter 6.1 mm.

Distribution
This extinct marine species was endemic to New Zealand

References

 Maxwell, P.A. (2009). Cenozoic Mollusca. pp. 232–254 in Gordon, D.P. (ed.) New Zealand inventory of biodiversity. Volume one. Kingdom Animalia: Radiata, Lophotrochozoa, Deuterostomia. Canterbury University Press, Christchurch.

External links
 Vella, Paul. "Tertiary Mollusca from south-east Wairarapa." Transactions of the Royal Society of New Zealand. Vol. 81. No. 4. 1954.

whangaimoana
Gastropods of New Zealand